Gilbert Hay, 11th Earl of Erroll PC (13 June 1631 – October 1674) was a Scottish nobleman.

Biography
He was the eldest son of William Hay, 10th Earl of Erroll by his wife,  Anne, only daughter of Patrick Lyon, 1st Earl of Kinghorne. He succeeded to the earldom at age 5, after his father's death in 1636. His uncle the Earl of Kinghorne was his tutor.

On 1 January 1651, Erroll took part in the Scottish coronation of King Charles II as  Lord High Constable of Scotland. Charles rode to Scone Abbey with William Keith, 7th Earl Marischal on his left and Erroll on his right.

For his part in the coronation, Erroll was heavily fined; Oliver Cromwell's government demanded £2000 sterling in 1654 under Cromwell's Act of Grace. Erroll petitioned this ruling, stating that he had not fought in any battles against England, and such a fine would bankrupt him. After the restoration, he received a regrant of his titles in 1666.

Erroll was appointed a member of the Privy Council in 1661.

On 7 January 1658, he married Lady Catherine Carnegie, daughter of James Carnegie, 2nd Earl of Southesk; they had no issue.  After his death, the countess became chief governess to James Francis, Prince of Wales in Saint-Germain-en-Laye.

He died childless and was succeeded in the earldom by his cousin John Hay, great-grandson of Andrew Hay, 8th Earl of Erroll.

References

Bibliography

1631 births
1674 deaths
11
17th-century Scottish people
Members of the Privy Council of Scotland
Gilbert, 11